Sammy Traoré (born 25 February 1976 in Créteil) is a French and Malian football manager, as a player his preferred position was a defender. He made good use of the stepover technique, rarely seen in defenders, to maintain possession and also start attacking moves.

Traore was a regular and successful member of the Mali national team between 2001 and 2008.

Managerial career
In July 2016, Traoré, a Muslim, was appointed as manager of the Jewish-supported Maccabi Créteil FC based in Paris.

Honors
Paris Saint-Germain
Coupe de France: 2009–10

Mali
Africa Cup of Nations four place: 2004

References

External links

1976 births
Living people
French people of Malian descent
Malian footballers
French footballers
Mali international footballers
2004 African Cup of Nations players
2008 Africa Cup of Nations players
Association football central defenders
US Créteil-Lusitanos players
OGC Nice players
Paris Saint-Germain F.C. players
AJ Auxerre players
Ligue 1 players
Ligue 2 players